Mykhaylo Dyachuk-Stavytskyi (born 1 January 1989) is a professional Ukrainian retired football midfielder and current football manager.

Career
He is the product of the Karpaty Lviv Youth School System. Dyachuk-Stavytskyi spent his career as a player in the Ukrainian First or Second Leagues.

From July 2016 he retired as player and become an assistant manager for Oleksandr Chyzhevskyi in the FC Karpaty Lviv Reserves and Youth Team.

Personal life
He is a son of the Ukrainian footballer and manager Yuriy Dyachuk-Stavytskyi.

References

External links 
Website Karpaty Profile 
Profile on Football Squads
Profile on Spartakus club site 
Profile at Official FFU site 

1989 births
Living people
Ukrainian footballers
Ukrainian expatriate footballers
Expatriate footballers in Poland
FC Karpaty-2 Lviv players
FC Enerhetyk Burshtyn players
FC Arsenal-Kyivshchyna Bila Tserkva players
FC Zirka Kropyvnytskyi players
Ukrainian football managers
Association football midfielders